The NHL 100 Classic  (branded as the Scotiabank NHL 100 Classic for sponsorship reasons) was a regular season outdoor National Hockey League (NHL) game held on December 16, 2017. The game featured the Ottawa Senators playing the Montreal Canadiens at TD Place Stadium in Ottawa (referred to as "Lansdowne Park" due to naming rights conflicts with an official sponsor of the NHL). It was the first of the three scheduled outdoor regular season games in the 2017–18 NHL season. 

As part of the NHL's centennial and local celebrations of Canada's sesquicentennial, the game was a rematch of one of the first two NHL games held on December 19, 1917, played between the Canadiens and the original Ottawa Senators. The Senators shut out the Canadiens, 3–0, with Ottawa goalie Craig Anderson making 28 saves.

It marked the first outdoor game hosted by Ottawa, and the second that Ottawa has participated in; they previously faced the Vancouver Canucks in the 2014 Heritage Classic. This was Montreal's fourth time appearing in an outdoor game.

Background 
The NHL 100 Classic was announced during a press conference on March 17, 2017. As part of the league's centennial celebrations, the game honoured the 100th anniversary of the first games of the NHL's inaugural season, held on December 19, 1917. Two games were played that night. In Ottawa, the original Ottawa Senators hosted the Montreal Canadiens at the Ottawa Arena. The other game was played in Montreal at the Montreal Arena where the Montreal Wanderers hosted the Toronto Arenas. The game was also part of Ottawa's festivities for the Canadian sesquicentennial. According to NHL commissioner Gary Bettman: "To launch our next 100 years, we believe it is only right to bring the Canadiens and the Senators back together." 

Mayor of Ottawa Jim Watson remarked that he had spent a significant amount of time to convince the NHL to hold an outdoor game in Ottawa, noting that "at some point I think I could be accused of harassment — borderline harassment — for the calls that went back and forth between my office and the NHL and the Senators. But it all came together."  At one point, the game was proposed to be played at a temporary venue on Parliament Hill, but the proposal was denied by the Department of Canadian Heritage due to logistical concerns. The league also explored holding the outdoor game on November 26, 2017, on the 100th anniversary of the league's founding. The league also felt that the 25,000-seat Percival Molson Memorial Stadium in Montreal was too small to host such a game.

Senators owner Eugene Melnyk suggested that an outdoor game involving the Senators' American Hockey League affiliate, the Belleville Senators (which moved from Binghamton, New York for the 2017–18 season) could be held as an undercard to the game, but this was not feasible.

Other festivities
Outside in Lansdowne Park, and inside the Aberdeen Pavilion, a "Pre-Game" area was set up. The area hosted the Stanley Cup for pictures, and various sponsor and media set up interactive exhibits and games. The games involved various puck-shooting drills, such as into a washing machine and goal net targets. A rink was set up outdoors on Parliament Hill and teams of NHL alumni played an exhibition game.

A major junior game between the Ottawa 67's of the Ontario Hockey League (who were celebrating their 50th anniversary; the team was established and named in honour of Canada's centennial) and the Gatineau Olympiques of the Quebec Major Junior Hockey League (QMJHL) was held on the rink on the following day, December 17, with the Olympiques winning 4–1. It marked the first outdoor Canadian Hockey League interleague game, and the seventh CHL outdoor game overall.

Television
The NHL 100 Classic was scheduled as the main 7 p.m. (Eastern Time) Hockey Night in Canada game, simulcast on both CBC Television and Sportsnet, as well as the French-language La super soirée LNH game on TVA Sports. NBCSN simulcast the HNIC feed in the United States.

Game summary 

Ottawa goalie Craig Anderson stopped all 28 Montreal shots, while Jean-Gabriel Pageau, Bobby Ryan and Nate Thompson each scored a goal. For the Canadiens, Carey Price made 35 saves in the loss.

Number in parenthesis represents the player's total in goals or assists to that point of the season

Team rosters

Scratches
Montreal Canadiens: Jacob de la Rose, Joe Morrow
Ottawa Senators: Nick Paul

Officials 
 Referees — Brad Watson, Marc Joannette
 Linesmen — Steve Barton, Derek Nansen

See also 
 NHL Heritage Classic

References 

NHL100 Classic
Ottawa Senators games
Montreal Canadiens games
NHL outdoor games
2017 in ice hockey
2017 in Ontario
December 2017 sports events in Canada
Ice hockey competitions in Ottawa
2010s in Ottawa
150th anniversary of Canada